Camogie was played in Kildare shortly after the sport was first organized in 1904. However, due to sparse records it is not certain when the first senior camogie championship was held. The earliest record of Camogie appears in an advertisement by Athy Ladies Hurling Club advertised a members reunion in July 1909. Kildare sent delegates to the Camogie congress of 1932, and a county board was formed in 1934 with Fr Byrne CC of Caragh as President, Mrs B McCarthy as vice-president, William Fisher of Newbridge as secretary, and Polly Smyth of Newbridge as treasurer. Camogie was reorganized at a county convention in 1954, and has been played in Kildare continuously since.

Roll of honour

Bibliography
Soaring Sliothars: Centenary of Kildare Camogie 1904-2004 by Joan O'Flynn Kildare County Camogie Board*
Kildare GAA: A Centenary History, by Eoghan Corry, CLG Chill Dara, 1984,  hb  pb

References

External links
St. Laurence's GAA
Celbridge GAA
Ardclough GAA
Caragh GFC

Camogie competitions
Kildare GAA club championships
Champiship